Arniqueiras is a Federal District Metro brazilian station on Orange and Green lines. It was opened on 5 February 2002 and added to the already operating section of the line, from Central to Terminal Samambaia and Ceilândia Sul. It is located between Guará and Águas Claras.

References

Brasília Metro stations
2002 establishments in Brazil
Railway stations opened in 2002